The Andalucía Rally is a rally raid which is disputed in the region of Andalucia, Spain, since 2020. The event has been part of the World Rally-Raid Championship since 2022.

The rally is organized by ASO and the ODC company, represented by the rally driver David Castera, and it is promoted together with the Rallye du Maroc as a shakedown for the Dakar Rally. It typically takes place in June, though the 2022 edition was moved to October due to a heat wave in the region.

Winners

Cars

Motorcycles

References

External links
 

Rally raid races
Recurring sporting events established in 2020
Cross Country Rally World Cup races
Rally competitions in Spain